Jean Jarratt Darnell (1889 – January 20, 1961) was an American silent film actress who had a brief career between 1912 and 1913.

In 1913, Darnell was a leading woman for the Thanhouser studio. She also acted for the Kalem Company. By November 1920, she was working in the publicity department of Goldwyn Distributing Corporation.

Filmography

References

External links
 

Actresses from Texas
American film actresses
American silent film actresses
1889 births
1961 deaths
20th-century American actresses